Arsenuranospathite  (IMA symbol: Aush) is a rare mineral with the chemical formula Al(UO2)2(AsO4)2F·20H2O. The name "arsenuranospathite" as arsenate analog of uranospathite was first used by Walenta (1963) with reference to a uranyl-arsenate mineral from Black Forest (Schwarzwald) massif, Germany. 

Later it was undoubtedly demonstrated that the name arsenuranospathite was applied, at least, to two different species – proper arsenuranospathite, ideally Al(UO2)2(AsO4)2F·20H2O, orthorhombic, and its partially dehydrated analogue, Al(UO2)2(AsO4)2F·nH2O (n = 8–10), tetragonal or pseudo-tetragonal.

Properties 
Yellow to yellow-greenish, transparent to opaque tabular and prismatic crystals, with perfect cleavage. Transparent to translucent. Hardness = ~2. Radioactive.

Chemical composition 
Contents of Al and U are very stable (1±0.05 and 2±0.07 atoms per As+P+U = 4 apfu respectively). Main variations of chemical compositions are connected with the ratio As:P and the content of F.

Occurrences 
Sophia Mine, Böckelsbach valley, Wittichen, Schenkenzell, Black Forest, Baden-Württemberg, Germany

See also
Chistyakovaite

References 

Uranium(VI) minerals
Uranyl compounds
Arsenate minerals
Fluorine minerals
Aluminium minerals